Jane Koziol-McLain is an American-New Zealand nursing academic, specialising in domestic violence. She is a full professor at the Auckland University of Technology.

Academic career
After an undergraduate at Loyola University in Chicago, Koziol-McLain did a 1989 MSc titled  'Variations in orthostatic vital signs in selected emergency department patients' and then a 1999 PhD at the University of Colorado. After a post-doc fellowship at Johns Hopkins University, she moved to Auckland University of Technology, where she rose to professor in 2008.

Koziol-McLain's work, since her PhD, largely relates to screening and risk factors for domestic violence.

Selected works 
 Campbell, Jacquelyn C., Daniel Webster, Jane Koziol-McLain, Carolyn Block, Doris Campbell, Mary Ann Curry, Faye Gary et al. "Risk factors for femicide in abusive relationships: Results from a multisite case control study." American Journal of Public Health 93, no. 7 (2003): 1089–1097.
 Abbott, Jean, Robin Johnson, Jane Koziol-McLain, and Steven R. Lowenstein. "Domestic violence against women: incidence and prevalence in an emergency department population." JAMA 273, no. 22 (1995): 1763–1767.
 Gilbert, Eric H., Steven R. Lowenstein, Jane Koziol-McLain, Diane C. Barta, and John Steiner. "Chart reviews in emergency medicine research: where are the methods?." Annals of Emergency Medicine 27, no. 3 (1996): 305–308.
 Honigman, Benjamin, Mary Kay Theis, Jane Koziol-McLain, Robert Roach, Ray Yip, Charles Houston, and Lorna G. Moore. "Acute mountain sickness in a general tourist population at moderate altitudes." Annals of Internal Medicine 118, no. 8 (1993): 587–592.
 Campbell, Jacquelyn C., Daniel W. Webster, Jane Koziol-McLain, Carolyn Rebecca Block, Doris Williams Campbell, Mary Ann Curry, Faye Gary et al. "Assessing risk factors for intimate partner homicide." National Institute of Justice Journal 250 (2003): 14–19.

References

External links
 
 
 
 

Living people
Year of birth missing (living people)
Domestic violence academics
New Zealand women academics
Loyola University Chicago alumni
University of Colorado alumni
Academic staff of the Auckland University of Technology
New Zealand nurses
American emigrants to New Zealand
New Zealand women writers